Amos Mariani (30 March 1931 – 20 February 2007) was an Italian professional football player and coach, who played as a forward. As a player, he represented the Italy national football team at the 1952 Summer Olympics.

Honours

Club
Juventus
 Serie A: 1949–50

Milan
 Serie A: 1956–57

Napoli
 Coppa Italia: 1961–62

References

External links
 

1931 births
2007 deaths
Italian footballers
Italy international footballers
Serie A players
Empoli F.C. players
Juventus F.C. players
Atalanta B.C. players
Udinese Calcio players
ACF Fiorentina players
A.C. Milan players
Calcio Padova players
S.S. Lazio players
S.S.C. Napoli players
Olympic footballers of Italy
Footballers at the 1952 Summer Olympics
Italian football managers
Ethnikos Piraeus F.C. managers
Association football forwards
People from Pistoia
Sportspeople from the Province of Pistoia
Footballers from Tuscany